Mouritius "Maurice" Prosper Peeters (5 May 1882 – 5 December 1957) was a track cyclist from the Netherlands, who represented his country at the two consecutive Summer Olympics (1920 and 1924).

He was born in Antwerp, Belgium, but was raised in The Hague. He died in nearby Leidschendam.

In 1920, Peeters became amateur world champion in track cycling. One day later he rode the Olympic 1000 m sprint, and of course he was considered a favourite. He lost in the first round, but his second place was enough to progress to the next round. He then won the quarter final and the semi-final. In the final, he rode against two British cyclists, Harry Ryan and Tiny Johnson. They tried to make use of their numerical advantage, and Ryan attacked, so that Peeters had to get him back. In the final corner, Johnson should came around the corner to win the race, but Peeters was ahead and kept his lead. After having won the gold medal at the 1920 Summer Olympics in Antwerp (1000 m sprint), making him the first Dutch individual Olympic champion, he captured the bronze medal four years later in the 2000 m tandem competition, alongside Gerard Bosch van Drakestein.

See also
 List of Dutch Olympic cyclists

References

External links
 Dutch Olympic Committee 

1882 births
1957 deaths
Dutch male cyclists
Cyclists at the 1920 Summer Olympics
Cyclists at the 1924 Summer Olympics
Olympic cyclists of the Netherlands
Olympic bronze medalists for the Netherlands
Olympic gold medalists for the Netherlands
Dutch track cyclists
Cyclists from Antwerp
Cyclists from The Hague
Olympic medalists in cycling
Medalists at the 1920 Summer Olympics
Medalists at the 1924 Summer Olympics